The X Factor was an Australian television reality music competition, based on the original UK series, to find new singing talent; the winner of which received a recording contract with record label Sony Music Australia. The second season premiered on the Seven Network on 30 August 2010 and ended on 22 November 2010. The winner was Altiyan Childs and his debut single "Somewhere in the World" was released after the final. Childs was mentored throughout by Ronan Keating, who won as mentor for the first time. The season was presented by Luke Jacobz, while spin-off show The Xtra Factor was hosted by Natalie Garonzi on 7Two. The show was originally to be hosted by actor Matthew Newton, however, he was forced to withdraw as host during production after an altercation with his former girlfriend Rachael Taylor and re-admitting himself to rehab. Guy Sebastian, Natalie Imbruglia, Keating and Kyle Sandilands who is the additional fourth judge joined the judging panel as replacements for former judges, Mark Holden, Kate Ceberano and John Reid.

The competition was split into several stages: auditions, bootcamp, judges' houses and live shows. Auditions took place throughout May and June 2010. After the auditions was bootcamp, where successful acts were split into four categories: Boys, Girls, Over 25s and Groups. Each judge was given a category to mentor and had to decide on their twelve acts after day two, and their six acts after day two. Special guest judges, including Havana Brown, Rebecca Batties, Mark Plunkett and Rai Thistlethwayte were brought in to help the judges decide their acts. Following bootcamp, was the judges' houses stage, where each of the judges reduced their six acts to three, with help from more guest judges, including Kelly Rowland, Sir Richard Branson, Boyzone, Snoop Dogg and Usher. The live shows began on 19 September 2010.

The second season had sparked controversy, including Childs' disappearance from the show and claims of a clash between the Girls. The grand final decider was watched by 1.63 million people, making it the highest rated television episode of the series.

Background and development 

On 16 May 2010, it was announced that the Seven Network would relaunch The X Factor with Guy Sebastian, Natalie Imbruglia, Ronan Keating and Kyle Sandilands (who is the additional fourth judge) confirmed as the four judges. The X Factor first screened on Network Ten in 2005, but was canceled after the first season due to poor ratings. Seven Network's head of programming, Tim Worner, said the "time was right" to relaunch the show, given Network Ten's decision to cancel Australian Idol. He explained: "We felt that there's no big light event shows around and that this is the best of them ... We've seen what Australia's Got Talent has done in heavy traffic and feel it's the right opportunity for the show."

On 30 May 2010, it was confirmed that actor Matthew Newton would be the host. However, on 22 August, it was revealed that Newton had withdrawn as the host of the show after an altercation in Rome with his now ex-girlfriend Rachael Taylor. Newton flew from Rome to Dublin, where he was to film segments for The X Factor with Keating. However, he was escorted back to Australia by a producer of the show after they decided he was in no state to film. He was then checked into Wentworthville's Northside West Clinic. On 23 August, actor Luke Jacobz announced that he would take over as host and all original audition footage with Newton was removed with footage of Jacobz being shot instead. On 28 August 2010, it was announced that radio presenter Natalie Garonzi would host the spin-off show The Xtra Factor on 7Two.

Selection process

Auditions

Bootcamp
The bootcamp stage of the competition began on 25 June 2010 in the Big Top at Luna Park, Sydney. This stage of the competition was first broadcast on 5 and 6 September 2010. In this stage, each judge was first given a category to mentor and had to decide on their top twelve acts after day one and their top six acts after day two. Sandilands was given the Boys, Imbruglia was given the Girls, Keating had the Over 25s and Sebastian was given the Groups category.

During bootcamp, the judges were assisted by musical artists who helped them choose their twelve acts. Havana Brown assisted with the Boys, MTV Australia CEO Rebecca Batties assisted with the Girls, Keating's manager Mark Plunkett with the Over 25s and Rai Thistlethwayte for the Groups category.

The 24 successful acts were:
Boys: Thomas TJ Alcaniz, Darcy Callus, Chris Doe, Andrew Lawson, Mitchell Smith, George Walter 
Girls: Ashlee Bellchambers, Sally Chatfield, Samantha Clarke, India-Rose Madderom, Alice McDermott, Hayley Teal
Over 25s: Altiyan Childs, Amanda Grafanakis, Max Jahufer, James McNally, Tony Munnings, Olivia Robins
Groups: Jahmakn It Funky, Kharizma, Lazy J & Big Guy, Luke & Joel, Mahogany, The Real Sisters

Judges' Houses
The final round of the selection process, the judges' houses, saw the judges reduce their six acts to three. Each judge took their six acts to exclusive locations around the world to experience the life of a superstar, introduce them to international artists and set the stage to inspire them to give the performance of a lifetime. Sandilands' Boys travelled to New York City, where they were assisted by Kelly Rowland. Imbruglia's Girls travelled to Necker Island to meet Richard Branson, while Keating's Over 25s visited his home town of Dublin, where they met up with his Boyzone bandmates. Sebastian's Groups travelled to Los Angeles, where he was assisted by rapper Snoop Dogg. While there, Sebastian had chosen Mahogany as one of his three acts, but was still unsure on who the other two acts should be. Sebastian and the groups then travelled to New York, where he was assisted by Usher.

Acts 

Key:
 – Winner
 – Runner-up

Live shows

Results summary
 Act in Team Kyle
 Act in Team Guy
 Act in Team Natalie Imbruglia
 Act in Team Ronan

  – Act in the bottom two and had to perform again in the final showdown
  – Act received the fewest public votes and was immediately eliminated (no final showdown)

Notes
1 Sebastian originally was asked to vote, but he deferred his vote to Keating as he "could not send his own act home".
2 Sandilands was not present for this results. As one of his acts (Mitchell Smith) was in the bottom two, a vote for India-Rose Madderom was cast on Sandilands's behalf on the assumption that he would save his own act.

Live show details

Week 1 (19/20 September)
Theme: Judges' Choice
Celebrity performers: Thirsty merc ("All My Life") and The Potbelleez ("Hello")
Group performance: "In My Head"

Judges' votes to eliminate
Imbruglia: Luke & Joel – felt that Doe had performed better.
Keating: Chris Doe – felt that it was too much for Doe that week.
Sebastian: Chris Doe – backed his own act, Luke & Joel.
Sandilands: Luke & Joel – backed his own act, Chris Doe.

With the acts in the bottom two receiving two votes each, the result went to deadlock and reverted to the earlier public vote. Doe was eliminated as the act with the fewest public votes.

Week 2 (26/27 September)
Theme: Musical Heroes
Celebrity performers: Justice Crew ("And Then We Dance") and Scarlett Belle ("Freak Tonight")
Group performance: "Dynamite"

Judges' votes to eliminate
Imbruglia: James McNally – gave no reason, but commented that neither act should be in the bottom two.
Sebastian: James McNally – based on the final showdown performance.
Sandilands: Amanda Grafanakis – had earlier commented that Grafanakis should be in the bottom two.
Keating: Amanda Grafanakis – could not send either of his own acts home and sent the result to deadlock.

With the acts in the bottom two receiving two votes each, the result went to deadlock and reverted to the earlier public vote. McNally was eliminated as the act with the fewest public votes.

Week 3 (3/4 October)
Theme: Songs that defined a decade
Celebrity performers: The Script ("For the First Time") and Amy Meredith ("Young at Heart")
Group performance: "Bad Romance"

Judges' votes to eliminate
Imbruglia: Kharizma – based on the final showdown performance, though commented that neither should be in the bottom two.
Sandilands: Kharizma – felt Kharizma had stalled while Mahogany continued to grow.
Sebastian abstained from voting as both acts were in his category.
Keating: Kharizma – based on the final showdown performance and comments made at beginning of the show.

Notes
Sebastian was absent from the live performance show but was present on the live results show through live telecast, thus eligible to vote if required.

Week 4 (10/11 October)
Theme: Party Anthems
Celebrity performers: Boyzone ("Life Is a Rollercoaster"/"Gave It All Away")
Group performance: "Club Can't Handle Me"

Judges' votes to eliminate
Imbruglia: Amanda Grafanakis – backed her own act, India-Rose Madderom.
Sandilands: Amanda Grafanakis – said that he would more likely "invest money" with Madderom.
Keating: India-Rose Madderom – backed his own act, Amanda Grafanakis.
Sebastian: Amanda Grafanakis – felt that Madderom was more consistent in the competition as a whole.

Week 5 (17/18 October)
Theme: Rock
Celebrity performers: Adam Lambert ("If I Had You") and Short Stack ("Planets")
Group performance: "Forget You"

Judges' votes to eliminate
Sandilands: India-Rose Madderom – despite his absence during the results show, an automatic vote was cast to save Mitchell Smith based on the usual assumption that he would have voted to save his own act.
Sebastian: India-Rose Madderom – stated that Madderom, despite being the better singer, had not grown throughout the competition.
Imbruglia: Mitchell Smith – backed her own act, India-Rose Madderom.
Keating: Mitchell Smith – could not decide and sent the result to deadlock.

With the acts in the bottom two receiving two votes each, the result went to deadlock and reverted to the earlier public vote. Smith was eliminated as the act with the fewest public votes.

Week 6 (24/25 October)
Theme: Blockbuster Hits
Celebrity performers: Stan Walker ("Choose You") and Kasey Chambers ("Little Bird")
Group performance: "DJ Got Us Fallin' in Love"

Judges' votes to eliminate
Keating: India-Rose Madderom – stated that earlier in the show that he believed this would be her last week on the show.
Imbruglia: Mahogany – backed her own act, India-Rose Madderom.
Sebastian: India-Rose Madderom – backed his own act, Mahogany.
Sandilands: India-Rose Madderom – been in the final showdown for the third time.

Week 7 (31 October/ 1 November)
Theme: Summer songs
Celebrity performers: Enrique Iglesias featuring Havana Brown ("Heartbeat") and Mike Posner ("Cooler Than Me")
Group performance: "Evacuate the Dancefloor"

Judges' votes to eliminate
Keating: Hayley Teal – said that Teal was lacking "energy and star quality" in this week's performances.
Imbruglia: Luke & Joel – backed her own act, Hayley Teal.
Sebastian:  Hayley Teal – backed his own act, Luke & Joel.
Sandilands: Hayley Teal – commented that it was about "who is going to be an icon of Australian music".

Week 8: Quarter-Final (7/8 November)
Theme: Songs from Australian artists
Celebrity mentor: Mel B
Celebrity performers: Jason Derülo ("The Sky's the Limit") and Jessica Mauboy ("Saturday Night")
Group performance: "Stop" with Mel B

Judges' votes to eliminate
Keating: Mahogany – commented that Luke & Joel have what it takes to sell records.
Imbruglia: Luke & Joel – felt that Mahogany performed better that week.
Sandilands: Luke & Joel – Mahogany can go more further.
Sebastian: Mahogany – could not send either of his own acts home and sent the result to deadlock.

With the acts in the bottom two receiving two votes each, the result went to deadlock and reverted to the earlier public vote. Luke & Joel were eliminated as the act with the fewest public votes.

Week 9: Semi-Final (14/15 November) 
 Theme: Number one singles
Celebrity mentor: Robin Gibb
 Celebrity performers: Ronan Keating featuring Paulini ("Believe Again") and Kesha ("We R Who We R")
 Group performance: "The Final Countdown"

Notes
For the first time this season, each act performed two songs.
Also for the first time, there was no final showdown and the act that received the fewest public votes was immediately eliminated.

Week 10: Final (21/22 November) 
21 November
 Theme: No theme (songs from the auditions and live shows that the mentor believes will show their true talent); celebrity duets
 Celebrity duet performers:
Jamiroquai with Sally Chatfield
James Blunt with Andrew Lawson
INXS with Altiyan Childs
Group performance: "Dynamite" and "With A Little Help From My Friends" – performed by all 12 finalists

22 November
Group performance: "Sweet Serendipity" (performed by Sally Chatfield and Altiyan Childs)
Celebrity performers: Jamiroquai ("White Knuckle Ride"), INXS ("New Sensation"), James Blunt ("Stay the Night") and Guy Sebastian featuring Eve ("Who's That Girl")

Reception

Controversies
On 18 October 2010, following the live results show, contestant Altiyan Childs disappeared from The X Factor house for almost 24 hours, causing a serious concern for his mentor Keating, who took to Twitter to try to locate where Childs was. Childs later returned at 5 pm the next day. A program producer said that he had "taken some time out to be by himself and slept in a cave on Sydney's northern beaches overnight". On 21 October, Childs spoke with guest host Keating and Jackie O on radio station 2Day FM to set the record straight about his disappearance. He explained: "It kind of hit me randomly at about 2 am that I had to reconnect with part of my sadness, it’s my secret power it’s what drives me through the song and ignites that part of me, it’s got to do with sadness, I needed to go back to somewhere where I felt an intimate romantic thing with an ancient memory and it worked. Childs stayed in a cave on Sydney's Northern Beaches. As he awoke, Childs realised he was supposed to be practising with his mentor Keating. The cave was a special place for Childs and his former fiancee. Their five-year engagement ended in 2002, but the hurt remains and Childs has been celibate since. He explained: "I was broken, a piece of me was broken and I didn't think it was repairable. I'm not used to comfort and compliments because I have never been accepted before. I needed to know what to do with the contentedness and beauty of it all, and I needed that place to do it."

On 25 October 2010 it was revealed that a name-calling cat fight between the Under 25 Girls had occurred during a performance at the Snaparazzi at Riva in St Kilda on 22 October. Contestant India-Rose Madderom was reportedly yelling abuse at contestant Sally Chatfield after the two missed their cues while performing David Guetta's "When Love Takes Over". Chatfield then fired back at Madderom before dissolving in tears. The girls mentor Imbruglia stepped in and reportedly told Madderom "you can't act like this in public" and "you have to be professional."

Ratings
The premiere episode on 30 August 2010 achieved an audience of 1,186,000 and placed fifth overall for the night, being beaten by A Current Affair's interview with Patty and Bert Newton, the parents of former X Factor host Matthew Newton, about his exit from the show due to his alleged attack on his former girlfriend Rachel Taylor. However, the premiere episode topped its timeslot. The second episode rated higher than the first, peaking at number four with an audience share of 1,482,000. The ratings boost was credited to Seven's top rating show Packed to the Rafters, which topped the night's overall ratings. The first live performance show on 19 September 2010 archived an audience of 1,095,000 and placed eighth overall for the night. The live grand final decider show on 22 November 2010 reached an audience of 1,833,000 and topped the night's overall ratings.

 Colour key:
  – Highest rating during the season
  – Lowest rating during the season

References

External links
 The X Factor at Yahoo!7

Season 2
2010 Australian television seasons
Australia 02